The following list shows NCAA Division I football programs by winning percentage during the 1960–1969 football seasons. During this time Division I was known as the University Division. The following list reflects the records according to the NCAA. This list takes into account results modified later due to NCAA action, such as vacated victories and forfeits.

 

 Chart notes

 San Diego State joined Division I in 1969.
 Bowling Green joined Division I in 1962.
 Long Beach State joined Division I in 1969.
 Miami (OH) joined Division I in 1962.
 Buffalo joined Division I in 1962.
 Fresno State joined Division I in 1969.
 UC Santa Barbara joined Division I in 1969.
 Southern Miss joined Division I in 1963.
 East Carolina joined Division I in 1965.
 Ohio joined Division I in 1962.
 Toledo joined Division I in 1962.
 Holy Cross missed the 1969 football season due to an outbreak of Hepatitis A.
 Western Michigan joined Division I in 1962.
 Louisville joined Division I in 1962.
 Montana left Division I after the 1962 season.
 George Washington dropped football after the 1966 season.
 Detroit Mercy dropped football after the 1964 season.
 Kent State joined Division I in 1962.
 Marshall joined Division I in 1962.
 Marquette dropped football after the 1960 season.
 Boston University left Division I after 1964.
 Denver dropped football after the 1960 season.
 Northern Illinois joined Division I in 1968.
 Hardin–Simmons left Division I after the 1962 season.
 Cal State Los Angeles joined Division I in 1969.

See also
 NCAA Division I FBS football win–loss records
 NCAA Division I football win–loss records in the 1950s
 NCAA Division I football win–loss records in the 1970s

References

Lists of college football team records